Svend Aage Thomsen (19 November 1918 – 30 October 1974) was a Danish wrestler. He competed at the 1948 Summer Olympics and the 1952 Summer Olympics.

References

External links
 

1918 births
1974 deaths
Danish male sport wrestlers
Olympic wrestlers of Denmark
Wrestlers at the 1948 Summer Olympics
Wrestlers at the 1952 Summer Olympics
Sportspeople from Aalborg